Du'a al-Baha (known as Du'a al-Sahar is a Du'a recommended to Muslims to recite in pre-dawns during Ramadan, when Muslims usually eat Suhur. Since it is very common among Shia, it is known Dua al-Sahar (supplication of pre-dawn), despite there are other supplications for pre-dawns of Ramadan.

Chain of authority 
The Du'a ascribed to Muhammad al-Baqir, fifth Shia Imam, and reported by Ali ibn Musa al-Riḍha, eighth Shia Imam.

Authenticity 
It is mentioned in Mafatih al-Jinan by Abbas Qumi.

Contents 
Dua al-Baha has 23 paragraphs which starts with “O Allah, I ask You to...” and beseech all of his glories, beauties, loftiness, greatness, luminosity, compassion, words, perfections, names, might, volition, omnipotence, knowledge, speeches, questions, honors, authorities, dominions, highness, bounties and signs. Then it is said: “O Allah, I ask You to give me whereby You gives answer to my supplication whenever I turn to You; therefore, hear my prayers, O Allah!”

Interpretation 
Several scholar including Ruhollah Khomeini, founder of Islamic revolution, wrote some books to explain the supplication. Description of the Dawn prayer (Sharhe Du'a al-Sahar) is Khomeini's first book.

See also
 Supplication of Abu Hamza al-Thumali
 Mujeer Du'a
 Jawshan Kabir
 Dua Ahd
 Du'a Kumayl
 Du'a Nudba

References

External links
 Du'a al-Baha text

Shia prayers
Salah terminology
Islamic terminology
Ramadan